The Revolutionary Communist Youth (RKU) is the youth wing of the Swedish Communist Party. It was founded in 1994 as a successor of the Young Communist League of Sweden (marxist-leninists), which existed 1972-1978. RKU publishes a magazine called Rebell.

The organization participates at the World Festivals of Youth and Students, arranged by the World Federation of Democratic Youth.

Politics 
The organization believes that capitalist society is not capable of satisfying the needs of the people. RKU believes that there are clear examples of capitalism's failure in Sweden, with high unemployment and worsening education system, while large corporations make billions in profits.

RKU believes that the only long-term solution to the problems of capitalism is a violent revolutionary rearrangement of society at large, and the construction of a new socialist society, where production will be organised from people's needs. RKU emphasizes that the envisioned socialist society must be democratic and controlled by the working class.

Rebell
Rebell is a Swedish youth magazine published by the Revolutionary Communist Youth. It was founded in 1994.

References

External links
Revolutionary Communist Youth

Youth wings of communist parties
Youth wings of political parties in Sweden
Youth organizations established in 1994
1994 establishments in Sweden